Somerset Wildlife Trust is a wildlife trust covering the county of Somerset, England.

The trust, which was established in 1964, aims to safeguard the county's wildlife and wild places for this and future generations and manages almost 80 nature reserves. Examples include Westhay Moor, Long Wood and Langford Heathfield. It has over 20,500 members and 500 volunteers.

The Somerset Wildlife Trust is part of the Wildlife Trusts partnership of 46 wildlife trusts in the United Kingdom.

In 2010 the organisation won a Biffa Award for their "Restoring Habitat for Dormice in Somerset" scheme.

In 2011 the Trust appealed for £100,000 from local residents and businesses to restore former peat diggings on the Somerset Levels.

Nature reserves

The Nature reserves include:
(* = Reserves designated as Sites of Scientific Interest)

See also
List of Sites of Special Scientific Interest in Somerset

References

External links
Somerset Wildlife Trust website

Charities based in Somerset
Environment of Somerset
Wildlife Trusts of England
Organisations based in Taunton